François Boucq (born 28 November 1955 in Lille), is a French comic book artist.  He is most famous for his surreal comics revolving around the main character .

Career
Boucq published cartoons in magazines like Le Point or L'Expansion at an early age. Soon, he also created comic albums, becoming famous with Les pionniers de l'aventure humaine. Boucq created the successful series Face de Lune in cooperation with the artist Alexandro Jodorowsky. 1994 saw the publication of Les dents du recoin, the first album of a series of surreal comics that feature Jérôme Moucherot, a door-to-door insurance salesman with a fountain pen through his nose, who is dressed in a leopard fur suit; his bizarre adventures take place in a world where Smurfs are jungle-dwelling headhunters and sharks swim around in the blue wallpapers of bourgeois living rooms.

Boucq later teamed up with Jodorowsky again, creating the graphic novel series Bouncer, set in a bleak Western scenario.

In 1998, Boucq was awarded the Grand Prix de la ville d'Angoulême. In keeping with the festival's tradition, he was the president of the jury in the following year.

Personal life
Apart from his comic book career he is an enthusiast of kendo (Japanese fencing), in which he achieved a 5 Dan master grade.

Selected bibliography
 Les pionniers de l'aventure humaine (Pioneers Of The Human Adventure)
  (The Magician's Wife) with writer Jerome Charyn
 La pédagogie du trottoir 
  (Billy Budd, KGB) with writer Jerome Charyn
 Face de Lune with Alejandro Jodorowsky
 Un point c'est tout 
 Les dents du recoin
  with writer Jerome Charyn
 Bouncer, with Alejandro Jodorowsky

Awards
 1985: Prix de la critique at the Angoulême International Comics Festival, France
 1986: Best French Comic at the Angoulême International Comics Festival
 1992: nominated for Best German-language Comic/Comic-related Publication at the Max & Moritz Prizes, Germany
 1996: nominated for Best Drawing at the Haxtur Awards, Spain
 1998: Grand Prix de la ville d'Angoulême, France
 1999: nominated for Best Short Comic Strip at the Haxtur Awards
 2001: nominated for the Humour Award at the Angoulême International Comics Festival
 2002: nominated for the Canal BD Award at the Angoulême International Comics Festival
 2003: 
nominated for the Audience Award at the Angoulême International Comics Festival
La Plumilla de Plata (The silver inkpen) in Mexico.
 2004: 
nominated for the Audience Award and the Series Award at the Angoulême International Comics Festival
nominated for Best international series at the Prix Saint-Michel, Belgium
 2006: 
Award for Best Drawing at the Albert Uderzo Awards
nominated for the Audience Award and the Series Award at the Angoulême International Comics Festival
 2008: nominated for Best Artwork at the Prix Saint-Michel
 2010: nominated for Best French Language Comic at the Prix Saint-Michel
 2012: Award for Best Artwork at the Prix Saint Michel

Notes

External links
 Website of Éditions Casterman, Boucq's publisher
 Paul Gravett, a journalist specialized in comics, on Boucq

1955 births
Living people
Artists from Lille
French comics artists
Grand Prix de la ville d'Angoulême winners